Greenhead was a former railway station, which served the village of Greenhead, Northumberland in Northumberland between 1836 and 1967.

History
The station opened on 20 July 1836 by the Newcastle and Carlisle Railway. On the east side was the goods yard and to the south was a locomotive shed and Blenkinsopp Colliery. The station closed on 2 January 1967. A coal station still survives in the goods yard.

References

External links
 

Disused railway stations in Northumberland
Railway stations in Great Britain opened in 1836
Railway stations in Great Britain closed in 1967
Beeching closures in England